"Weird Al" Yankovic in 3-D (often referred to simply as In 3-D) is the second studio album by American singer-songwriter "Weird Al" Yankovic, released on February 28, 1984, by Rock 'n Roll Records. The album was one of many produced by former McCoys guitarist Rick Derringer. Recorded between October and December 1983, the album was Yankovic's follow-up to his modestly successful debut LP, "Weird Al" Yankovic.

The album is built around parodies and pastiches of pop and rock music of the mid-1980s. Half of the album is made up of parodies of artists like Michael Jackson, Men Without Hats, the Greg Kihn Band, the Police, and Survivor. The other half of the album contains many "style parodies", musical imitations that come close to but do not directly copy a specific work by existing artists. These style parodies include imitations of artists such as Bob Marley and the B-52s. This album marked a musical departure from Yankovic's self-titled debut, in that the arrangements of the parodies were now closer to the originals. Also, the accordion was no longer used in every song, but only  where deemed appropriate or comically inappropriate. The album is also notable for being the first album released by Yankovic to include a polka medley of hit songs. A similar pastiche of hit songs, set to polka music, has since appeared on nearly all of Yankovic's albums.

"Weird Al" Yankovic in 3-D was met with mostly positive reviews and peaked at number seventeen on the Billboard 200 and number sixty-one in Australia. The album also produced one of Yankovic's most famous singles, "Eat It" (a parody of Michael Jackson's "Beat It"), which peaked at number twelve on the Billboard Hot 100. This song was Yankovic's highest-charting single until "White & Nerdy" from his 2006 album Straight Outta Lynwood peaked at number nine in the October 21, 2006 Billboard charts. "Eat It" also charted at number one in Australia, making it Yankovic's only number one single in any country. The album also produced two minor US hits, "King of Suede", which peaked at number sixty-two, and "I Lost on Jeopardy", which peaked at number eighty-one. The album was Yankovic's first Gold record, and went on to be certified Platinum for sales of over one million copies in the United States. "Eat It" won a Grammy Award for Best Comedy Performance Single or Album, Spoken or Musical in 1985.

Production

Recording
In October 1983, Yankovic began recording his second album at Santa Monica Sound Recorders, in Santa Monica, California. To produce it, he brought in former McCoys guitarist Rick Derringer, who also produced Yankovic's first album. Backing Yankovic were Jon "Bermuda" Schwartz on drums, Steve Jay on bass, and Jim West on guitar. During the first recording session for the album, five original songs were recorded: "Nature Trail to Hell", "Mr. Popeil", "Buy Me a Condo", "Midnight Star", and "That Boy Could Dance". Two months later, Yankovic began recording the five parodies and polka medley that would appear on the album: "Eat It", "King of Suede", "I Lost on Jeopardy", "Theme from Rocky XIII (The Rye or the Kaiser)", "The Brady Bunch", and "Polkas on 45".

Every song on Yankovic's debut album was played on an accordion, accompanied by bass, guitar, and drums. On In 3-D, Yankovic decided to restrict the accordion to certain sections, most notably the polka medley "Polkas on 45". In the "Ask Al" section of his web site, Yankovic explained: "Nowadays, I only use it on original songs where I feel an accordion is appropriate, and on parody songs where I feel an accordion is [comically] inappropriate ... and of course, on the polka medleys. I'm not really downplaying the accordion at all – I usually feature the accordion on three or four songs every album, which is three or four more accordion-based songs than most Top 40 albums have!"

Originals
One of the first originals recorded for the album was "Midnight Star", a loving ode to fictional supermarket tabloids. The liner notes to Permanent Record state that a Weekly World News article about the "Incredible Frog Boy" helped to inspire the song. According to Yankovic, most of the tabloid headlines were real. He spent several weeks collecting and looking through old tabloids to find inane titles. Initially, he thought that "Midnight Star" should have been the lead single for the album, but later relented and released "Eat It" instead. "Buy Me a Condo" is a style parody of Bob Marley and the reggae genre in general.

"Mr. Popeil" is a song discussing the inventor Sam Popeil (the father of inventor Ron Popeil) and his myriad inventions of varying usefulness. Musically, it is a style parody of the B-52s, which Robert Christgau wrote "exploits Yankovic's otherwise fatal resemblance to Fred Schneider." One of the backing vocalists on the track is Ron Popeil's sister, Lisa Popeil. When recording the song, Yankovic came across an article about Lisa Popeil and her singing career and later asked her if she would be interested in appearing in the song, to which she agreed.

The last original song to be recorded for the album was "Nature Trail to Hell", about a fictional slasher film "in 3-D"; 3D film had enjoyed a brief resurgence in 1981–83, with the likes of Parasite, Friday the 13th Part III and Amityville 3-D being successful 3-D horrors. At the 3:40 mark, the song has a backward message that says "Satan eats Cheez Whiz!" This, in turn, was a parody of the Satanic backmasking scare during the early 1980s. Online magazine Pitchfork Media has alluded to the song several times, once comparing it to "Thrill Kill" by the Damned, and another time sarcastically calling the song a "classic".

Parodies and polka
The first parody recorded for the album was "The Brady Bunch", a parody of "The Safety Dance" by Men Without Hats, in which the narrator expresses his dislike of the sitcom The Brady Bunch. The song also contains a lyrical adaptation of the "Brady Bunch Theme Song", something that Yankovic would later do in his "Money for Nothing/Beverly Hillbillies" parody from UHF (1989).

On the same day that "The Brady Bunch" was recorded, Yankovic started working on "I Lost on Jeopardy", a parody of "Jeopardy" by the Greg Kihn Band. The song describes a situation in which the narrator loses spectacularly on the game show Jeopardy!. Show announcer Don Pardo lends his voice to a segment of the song. In order to create the parody, Yankovic cleared the idea not only with Greg Kihn, but also with Merv Griffin, who created the show. Don Pardo, Art Fleming, and Kihn all appeared in the music video. Kihn, the composer of the original song, was extremely pleased and flattered by the parody. In 2009, Kihn wrote a blog on his MySpace called "Weird Al and Mailbox Money", in which he complimented Yankovic's comedy and explained the mechanics of how a parody works. Kihn referred to the royalty checks he still receives from "I Lost on Jeopardy" as "Mailbox Money".

The next parodies to be recorded were "Theme from Rocky XIII (The Rye or the Kaiser)", a parody of Survivor's "Eye of the Tiger", about a washed-up Rocky Balboa who now runs a deli and occasionally beats up on the liverwurst; and "King of Suede", a parody of the Police's "King of Pain", about a clothing store owner who claims the titular title. In order to research information for the latter, Yankovic would walk around in fabric stores taking notes. He later remarked, "I got a lot of nasty stares from store managers."

The final parody recorded for the album was "Eat It", a parody of Michael Jackson's "Beat It", about an exasperated parent whose picky child is refusing to eat. Yankovic formulated the idea during a brainstorming session between himself, Robert K. Weiss, and his manager, Jay Levey. They were bouncing ideas off one another until suddenly "[they] had the whole thing written." Although he knew that the best way to get permission to parody a song was through the official songwriter, Yankovic was unsure what type of reaction he would get from Jackson when presented with the parody lyrics. However, Jackson allegedly thought it was a "funny idea", and allowed the parody. In the mockumentary The Compleat Al, there is a scene portraying the fictitious meeting of Yankovic and Jackson. Musically, the parody is slightly different from the original, being set in a changed key, comic sound effects, and an Eddie Van Halen-inspired guitar solo from Yankovic's producer, Rick Derringer.

"Eat It" was Yankovic's first—and, until "Smells Like Nirvana" (1992), his only—Top Forty hit, peaking at number twelve on the Billboard Hot 100. It was also Yankovic's highest-charting single until "White & Nerdy" reached number nine on the October 21, 2006, Billboard chart. "Eat It" was a worldwide hit, even managing to peak at number one in Australia. For many years, Yankovic became known colloquially as "The 'Eat It' guy." He referred to this sarcastically on his own personal Twitter; at one point, Al's Twitter Bio read: "You know ... the Eat It guy."

One of the last songs recorded for the album was "Polkas on 45". The song, whose title is a take on the novelty act Stars on 45, is a medley of popular rock songs from the 1960s and 1970s. "Polkas on 45" evolved from an early polka medley that Yankovic had played when opening for new wave band Missing Persons in 1982. This early version included parts of various new wave songs, including "Jocko Homo" by Devo, "Homosapien" by Pete Shelley, "Sex Junkie" by Plasmatics, "T.V.O.D." by the Normal, "Bad Boys Get Spanked" by the Pretenders, "TV Party" by Black Flag, "Janitor" by Suburban Lawns, and "People Who Died" by Jim Carroll. After being asked how he picked the songs to include, Yankovic responded, "I just pick songs that sound slightly better done polka style—the way God intended."

Critical reception

The album received a score of four and a half stars from AllMusic, with Eugene Chadbourne saying, "With an album behind him, Weird Al Yankovic makes much of the improvements expected of new artists when they get a second crack at a release a year later." Christopher Thelen from The Daily Vault wrote that "All in all, this disc held out the promise that Yankovic was destined for greatness ..." In addition, "Weird Al" Yankovic in 3-D was also named one of the Year's Top 10 Albums in 1984 by People magazine. Den of Geek even named In 3-D as one of the "10 Reasons Why 1984 Was a Great Year for Geek Movies"—despite it not being a movie. On November 1, 2011, Spin magazine named In 3-D as the seventeenth greatest comedy album of all time.

Not all reviews were positive, however. Robert Christgau of The Village Voice gave the album a C+ rating, calling it "Mad for the ears." Some critics were split on how Yankovic composed, performed, and recorded his parodies, compared to his 1983 debut album. The Daily Vault commented thus:

Many of the songs and singles from In 3-D would later appear on greatest hits albums. "Eat It" and "I Lost on Jeopardy" appeared both on Yankovic's first greatest hits album (1988) and on The Essential "Weird Al" Yankovic (2009); the latter also included "Polkas on 45". Seven of the album's songs ("Polkas on 45", "Midnight Star", "Eat It", "Mr. Popeil", "I Lost on Jeopardy", "Buy Me a Condo", and "King of Suede") appeared in Yankovic's box set Permanent Record: Al in the Box.

At the 27th Grammy Awards in 1985, "Weird Al" Yankovic won his first Grammy Award, the Best Comedy Performance Single or Album, Spoken or Musical, for his hit single "Eat It".

Commercial performance
"Weird Al" Yankovic in 3-D was released on February 28, 1984. On April 28, it peaked at number 17, where it remained for three consecutive weeks. In 3-D spent a total of twenty-three weeks on the chart. It was also successful in Australia, where it peaked at number 61 on the album chart. Many of the album's singles also went on to be successful. "Eat It" eventually sold over a half a million copies, peaked at number twelve domestically on the Billboard Hot 100, and was certified Gold. It was also a worldwide hit, peaking at number thirty-six in the United Kingdom and number one in Australia. As of March 2012, "Eat It" is currently Yankovic's only number one single in any country. "King of Suede" and "I Lost on Jeopardy", the album's follow up singles, peaked on the Hot 100 at numbers 61 and 82, respectively.

On April 30, 1984, two months after its release, the album was certified Gold by the Recording Industry Association of America (RIAA), making it Yankovic's first Gold record. On August 18, 1995, it was certified Platinum by the RIAA.

Track listing

Personnel
Credits adapted from LP liner notes, except where noted.

Band members
 "Weird Al" Yankovic – vocals, accordion, piano, synthesizer
 Jim West – guitars
 Steve Jay – bass guitar, banjo, talking drums
 Jon "Bermuda" Schwartz – drums, percussion

Additional musicians
 Rick Derringer – guitar, mandolin; backing vocals
 Lisa Popeil – female background vocals
 Pattie Brooks – female background vocals
 Petsye Powell – female background vocals
 Andrea Robinson – female background vocals
 Bob Tebow – bass vocals
 Pat Regan – synthesizer, piano
 Jimmy Zavala – saxophone
 Warren Luening – trumpet
 Joel Peskin – clarinet
 Jim Self – tuba
 Joel Miller – bongos
 "Musical Mike" Kieffer – musical hands 
 Don Pardo – spoken word vocal (track 5)

Technical
 Rick Derringer – producer 
 Tony Papa – engineer
 Lane/Donald – art direction
 Jim Heimann – cover illustration
 Jay Pope – cover photo

Charts

Singles

Certifications

References

"Weird Al" Yankovic albums
1984 albums
Albums produced by Rick Derringer
Rock 'n Roll Records albums
Scotti Brothers Records albums